Iqbal Theba (pronounced ; born December 20, 1963) is a Pakistani actor. Theba is best known for his recurring role as Principal Figgins in the show Glee.

Early life
Theba was born in Karachi, Pakistan. He belongs to the Theba clan, a Gujarati-speaking group originating from Sindh.

Theba attended the University of Oklahoma for civil engineering in 1981, but dropped out to pursue an acting career in New York. He has a BS degree in Construction Engineering Management. Theba returned to the University of Oklahoma in 1986 to get a theater degree. He moved to Los Angeles, California upon graduating.

Career
Theba experienced an early career break with a role on the NBC television pilot Death and Taxes. While the pilot was not picked up to series, it led to a recurring role for Theba on The George Carlin Show.  Theba also had brief recurring roles on Married... with Children and ER. He had a recurring role in ABC/CBS comedy sitcom Family Matters. His other credits include appearances on Nip/Tuck, Alias, Two and a Half Men, Bosch, Roseanne, Kitchen Confidential, Chuck, JAG, Arrested Development, Childrens Hospital, The Tick, The West Wing, Friends, Sister Sister, Seinfeld,  Everybody Loves Raymond, King of the Hill, Weeds, Community, and Transformers: Dark of the Moon. Theba also appeared in an episode of the sitcom Yes, Dear. 

In 2009, 2010, and 2013, Theba guest starred in three episodes of NBC's Community as Gobi Nadir, the father of Abed Nadir (played by Danny Pudi). He also guest starred on CBS' NCIS in 2012.

He also was seen on the eighth episode of the eighth season of Hell's Kitchen, attending the 100th dinner service.

In 2017, Theba voiced Slav in season 2 of Voltron: Legendary Defender. Theba played General Umair Zaman, a Pakistani general who stages a military coup, on the HBO comedy series The Brink.

Glee (2009–15)
Theba's longest-running role has been as Principal Figgins in the Fox television series Glee. Throughout the course of the six seasons, Theba appeared in 58 episodes.

Although Figgins was initially conceived as white, the Pakistani-American Theba was cast in the role. He said playing Figgins entails finding "the right mix of someone who is an authority figure but who is also very insecure about his own strengths as a person."

In 2012, Theba appeared on the first and ninth episodes of the second season of The Glee Project.

Personal life
He is married and has two children: a son, Mikael,  and a daughter, Ranya.

Filmography

Film

Television

Video games

References

External links

1963 births
Living people
American film actors of Pakistani descent
American male film actors
American male television actors
American male voice actors
American people of Gujarati descent
American Muslims
20th-century American male actors
21st-century American male actors
American people of Sindhi descent
Male actors from Karachi
Pakistani emigrants to the United States
Pakistani male television actors
Pakistani people of Gujarati descent